Georg Weber (10 February 1808 in Bad Bergzabern – 10 August 1888 in Heidelberg) was a German historian.

He studied at Erlangen. In 1839, he became a teacher at the upper Bürgerschule in Heidelberg, and from 1848 to 1872 was its director.

Among Weber's historical publications may be mentioned:
 Geschichtliche Darstellung des Calvinismus im Verhältniss zum Staat in Genf und Frankreich bis zur Aufhebung des Edikts von Nantes,  1836 – Historical background of Calvinism in relationship to the state in Geneva and France up until the repeal of the Edict of Nantes.
 Weltgeschichte in übersichtlicher Darstellung – later translated into English and published as Outlines of universal history from the creation of the world to the present time (1851).
 Geschichte des Volkes Israel und der Entstehung des Christenthums (History of the people of Israel and the emergence of Christianity, with Heinrich Julius Holtzmann, 1867). 
 Allgemeine Weltgeschichte (Basic world history; 15 volumes, 2nd edition 1882–89).
 Geschichte der deutschen Literatur von ihren Anfängen bis zur Gegenwart (History of German literature from its beginnings to the present; 11th edition, 1880).

References
 

1808 births
1888 deaths
People from Bad Bergzabern
People from the Palatinate (region)
19th-century German historians
19th-century German male writers
German male non-fiction writers